Modal Soul Classics is a compilation album from Japanese hip hop producer Nujabes. Though the music on this album is commonly attributed to Nujabes, none of it is composed by him; the songs on this album were only compiled and mastered by him. All of it is by other artists who have inspired Nujabes.

Track listing 

 Scott Matelic - "To Impress the Empress"                           4:21
 Sleep Walker - "AI-NO-KAWA"                                        6:36                                                                          
 Goldlix - "Atoll Moao"                                             4:55
 Specifics - "Under the Hood"                                       3:53
 DSK - "Winter Lane"                                                4:27
 Blue Asia - "Mourn, Sob & Cry"                                     4:56
 Haki R. Madhubuti - "Children"                                    10:36
 Unison - "Sound Network"                                           4:07    
 Takero Ogata - "Omnipresence"                                      4:31
 Todd Rundgren - "A Dream Goes On Forever"                      2:22
 Heprcam - "Dionna"                                                 2:53
 Clammbon - "Folklore"                                          5:19
 Lava - "Vem Para Ficar" (from Ristorante Mixtape)                  6:40
 Omar Sosa - "Iyawo"                                            6:22

Hip hop compilation albums
2008 compilation albums
Nujabes albums